There are four types of elections in Spain: general elections, elections to the legislatures of the autonomous communities (regional elections), local elections and elections to the European Parliament. General elections and elections to the legislatures of the autonomous communities are called after the mandate of the national or regional legislature expires, usually four years after the last election, although early elections may occur. Elections to local councils (municipal and insular) and to the European Parliament are held on fixed dates but some local government bodies (including provincial councils) are not directly elected. For most elections party list PR is used, but the plurality system is used for the Senate.

General elections

General elections are elections held for the national legislature, which is called in Spain Cortes Generales (Spanish for "General Courts") and consists of two chambers, the Congress of Deputies and the Senate. The Congress and Senate usually serve concurrent terms that run for a maximum of four years. However, the Prime Minister has the prerogative to dissolve both Houses at any given time either jointly or separately.

Congress of Deputies
The Congress is composed of 350 members directly elected by universal adult suffrage for a four-year term of office. Each one of Spain's fifty provinces is a constituency entitled to an initial minimum of two seats; the cities of Ceuta and Melilla elect one member each. The remaining 248 seats are allocated among the fifty provinces in proportion to their populations. Parties, federations, coalitions and agrupaciones de electores (electors' groups) may present candidates or lists of candidates. The lists are closed, so electors may not choose individual candidates in or alter the order of such lists. Electors cast a ballot for a single list, or for a single candidate in Ceuta and Melilla.

The seats in each constituency are apportioned according to the largest average method of proportional representation (PR), conceived by the Belgian mathematician Victor d'Hondt in 1899 (d'Hondt method). However, in order to participate in the allocation of seats, a list must receive at least three percent of all valid votes cast in the constituency, including blank ballots. The single-member seats in Ceuta and Melilla are filled by the plurality or first-past-the-post method, under which the candidate obtaining the largest number of votes in the constituency is elected.

Seat allocation in Congress

To illustrate the functioning of the system, the allocation of seats in the three provinces of the Self-Governing or Autonomous Community of Aragón - Huesca, Teruel and Zaragoza - for the June 1993 general election is presented here in detail. At the time, Zaragoza province had seven seats in Congress, while both Huesca and Teruel had three.

In Zaragoza province, only four tickets, namely the Spanish Socialist Workers Party (PSOE), the Popular Party (PP), the Aragonese Party (PAR) and the United Left (IU) won at least three percent of the valid votes cast in the election - including blank ballots - and were thus entitled to participate in the allocation of constituency seats. The tickets were sorted by number of votes from top to bottom, and the votes polled by each of these were then divided by 1, 2, 3, and so on until the number of seats to be allocated was reached, as detailed below:

  
Seats were then awarded to the tickets obtaining the largest quotients or averages (shown in bold). As indicated, the PSOE won three seats, the PP two, the PAR one and IU one. The seats won by each ticket were awarded to the candidates included therein, according to their ranking on the lists: therefore, the first three candidates on the PSOE list were elected to Congress, as were the first two candidates on the PP list and the candidates at the top of the PAR and IU lists, respectively.

Meanwhile, the results of the election in Huesca province were as follows:

 
The effective representation threshold in Huesca was 25,360 votes, or 19.0% of the valid vote.

Finally, the outcome of the election in Teruel was the following:

  
The effective representation threshold in Teruel was 18,163 votes, or 20.2% of the valid vote.

Having concluded the allocation of Congress seats in the three Aragón constituencies, the following peculiarities stand out:

 The effective representation threshold in each province was substantially larger than the three percent barrier set forth by law: in all three constituencies, the seat apportionment would have been the same regardless of the statutory threshold.
 The number of votes required to attain a seat in Zaragoza province - the largest of three constituencies - was substantially higher than the amount required to that end in Huesca or in Teruel.
 The proportional allocation of seats in each constituency appeared to favor the major parties in general and specifically the majority party.

Senate
The system for electing the Senate was first used in 1979, though with regard to the provinces the system is unchanged since 1977. Senators are elected directly from the provinces and indirectly from the autonomous communities; currently, there are 264 senators, 208 directly elected and 56 indirectly elected.

In the provinces, a majoritarian partial block voting system is used. All peninsular provinces elect four senators each; the insular provinces (Balearic and Canary Islands) elect one or three senators per island, and Ceuta and Melilla elect two senators each. Parties nominate three candidates; each voter has three votes (fewer in those constituencies electing fewer senators) and votes for candidates by name, the only instance of personal voting in Spanish national elections. The usual outcome is three senators for the party with the most votes, and one senator for the runner-up, except in very close races.

The autonomous communities receive one senator, plus one for each million inhabitants. They are entitled to determine how they choose their senators but are generally elected by the legislature of the respective community in proportion to its party composition.

Election results 1977–2019

Regional elections
1983 Spanish regional elections
1987 Spanish regional elections
1991 Spanish regional elections
1995 Spanish regional elections
1999 Spanish regional elections
2003 Spanish regional elections
2007 Spanish regional elections
2011 Spanish regional elections
2015 Spanish regional elections
2019 Spanish regional elections
2020 Spanish regional elections

Elections to the unicameral parliaments of the autonomous communities of Spain are held every four years. Twelve of the seventeen autonomous parliaments (Aragon, Asturias, Balearic Islands, Canary Islands, Cantabria, Castile and León, Castilla–La Mancha, Extremadura, La Rioja, Madrid, Murcia and Navarre) take place the same day, the fourth Sunday of May of the year before a leap year; the last election was held on 26 May 2019.

The other five communities (considered "historical nationalities" within the country of Spain) can choose the date of their regional elections independently. The last elections held in these communities were in Andalusia in December 2018; Valencian Community in April 2019 (for the first time separated from the rest of regional elections, although at the same date that the snap General Election for that year); Basque Country and Galicia in July 2020; and Catalonia in February 2021.

Local elections
1979 Spanish local elections
1983 Spanish local elections
1987 Spanish local elections
1991 Spanish local elections
1995 Spanish local elections
1999 Spanish local elections
2003 Spanish local elections
2007 Spanish local elections
2011 Spanish local elections
2015 Spanish local elections
2019 Spanish local elections
Elections in the municipalities take place in all the country in the same day as the regional elections, the fourth Sunday of May of the year before a leap year. Last time was 26 May 2019.

Elections to the European Parliament
1987 European Parliament election in Spain
1989 European Parliament election in Spain
1994 European Parliament election in Spain
1999 European Parliament election in Spain
2004 European Parliament election in Spain
2009 European Parliament election in Spain
2014 European Parliament election in Spain
2019 European Parliament election in Spain

Referendums
1976 Spanish political reform referendum
1978 Spanish constitutional referendum
1986 Spanish NATO membership referendum
2005 Spanish European Constitution referendum

Electoral procedures 
The laws regulating the conduct and administration of elections are laid out in detail in the 1985 electoral law. (Ley Orgánica del Régimen Electoral General.) Under this law, the elections are supervised by the Electoral Commission (Junta Electoral), a permanent body composed of eight Supreme Court judges and five political scientists or sociologists appointed by the Congress of Deputies. The Electoral commission is supported in its work by the Interior Ministry. On election day, polling stations are run by electoral boards which consist of groups of citizens selected by lottery.

The format of the ballot paper is designed by the Spanish state, however, the law allows political parties to produce and distribute their own ballot papers, either by mailing them to voters or by other means such as street distribution, provided that they comply with the official model. The government then covers the cost of all printed ballot papers. These must then be marked by voters, either in the polling station or outside the polling station and placed inside sealed envelopes which are then placed inside ballot boxes in the polling station. Following the close of polls, the ballots are then counted in each individual polling station in the presence of representatives of the political parties and candidates. The ballots are then immediately destroyed, with the exception of those considered invalid or challenged by the candidates' representatives, which are retained for further scrutiny. The result is that full recounts are impossible.

See also
 Electoral calendar
 Electoral system
 Local government in Spain

References

Notes

External links
General Directorate of Domestic Politics, archived results back to 1976 
Adam Carr's Election Archive
Parties and elections
 NSD: European Election Database - Spain publishes regional level election data; allows for comparisons of election results, 199-2008